Edward Francis Mandible (11 May 1885 – 3 April 1936) was an Australia national representative rugby union fly-half and one of the pioneers who broke away from that code to take up rugby league in Sydney in 1910.

Early life
Mandible was born in Woolloomooloo, Sydney.

Rugby union career
Mandible was selected on the first Wallaby 1908–09 Australia rugby union tour of the British Isles and France, the squad captained by Herbert Moran. He played in the first Test match of the tour against Wales on 12 December 1908 in Cardiff. He claimed a career total of three international rugby caps for Australia.

His jersey from the first Wallabies Rugby Union Tour of the United Kingdom in 1908 was purchased by the National Museum of Australia.

Rugby league career
Following his return from the 1908-09 Wallaby tour he took part in a series of matches between the Australian Wallabies and Kangaroos in 1909. Facing reprisals from rugby union for playing in this non-sanctioned series, Mandible switched codes in 1910 to play rugby league with the Eastern Suburbs club. He played just two matches for Easts, scoring one try.

Death
Edward Mandible died in Perth, Western Australia in April 1936. He was buried at Karrakatta Cemetery, in Perth, Western Australia on 4 April 1936.

References

External links
 Roosters 100 Years Player List

1885 births
1936 deaths
Australian rugby union players
Australia international rugby union players
Sydney Roosters players
Australian rugby league players
Rugby league players from Sydney
Burials at Karrakatta Cemetery
Rugby union fly-halves
Rugby union players from Sydney